Maine Central Railroad Class L locomotives were intended for main line passenger service. They were of 4-4-0 wheel arrangement in the Whyte notation, or "2'B" in UIC classification. They were transferred to branch line passenger service as replaced by class N 4-6-0 locomotives beginning in 1899. Ten numbered 191 to 201 survived United States Railroad Administration operations to appear on a 1923 roster. All were retired between 1925 and 1947 and were scrapped from 1945-1955 . None were preserved.

References 

Steam locomotives of the United States
4-4-0 locomotives
Schenectady Locomotive Works locomotives
L
Railway locomotives introduced in 1893
Standard gauge locomotives of the United States